Azra is a given name. Notable people with the name include:

 Azra Akın, Dutch-Turkish beauty pageant titleholder
 Azra Duliman, Miss Sweden of 2009
 Azra Erhat, Turkish author
 Azra Ghani, English epidemiologist
 Azra Hadzic, Bosnian tennis player
 Azra Jafari, Afghan politician
 Azra Kolaković, real name of Donna Ares, Bosniak folk singer
 Azra Muranovic (born 1987), Swedish politician
 Azra Fazal Pechuho, Pakistani politician
 Azra Raza, Pakistani-American professor
 Azra Sherwani, Pakistani film actor

Arabic feminine given names
Turkish feminine given names
Bosnian feminine given names
Pakistani feminine given names